The Chunara are an ethnic group found in the state of Gujarat in India. A small number are also found in the port city of Karachi in Pakistan. There are now two communities of Chunara, one Hindu and the other Muslim.

Origin
The word chunara in Gujarati literally means someone who manufactures chuna (lime). According to their traditions, they were originally Rajputs who migrated from Rajasthan to Gujarat and joined the army of Gaekwars of Baroda. After having a fall out with their employer, the Maratha ruler of Baroda, they took to manufacturing lime. A section of the Chunara then converted to Islam, and there are now distinct communities, one Hindu and the other Muslim. The Kadias and Bricklayers are also called Chunaras or lime-men whose main profession is brick laying, though a few among them work as masons.(BY DEPARTMENT OF CENSUS, GOVERNMENT OF INDIA)

Present circumstances
Some members communities still own lime kilns employing other Chunaras. Other than selling lime, some Chunara are now also petty businessmen. The Chunara are endogamous, with the Hindu section practising clan exogamy. The Muslim Chunara practise clan endogamy e.g. cross cousin and parallel cousin marriages. For the Hindu community, the goddess Hinglaj Mata is a tribal deity. The Muslims belong to the Sunni sect.

See also
 Vanzha

References

Social groups of Gujarat
Muslim communities of India
Muslim communities of Gujarat
Indian castes
Indian architectural history
Indian words and phrases